Catagenesis is a somewhat archaic term from evolutionary biology referring to evolutionary directions that were considered "retrogressive."  It was a term used in contrast to anagenesis, which in present usage denotes the evolution of a single population into a new form without branching lines of descent.

See also 

 Evolutionary biology

References

Evolutionary biology